Ropa  (Ropa) is a village in Gorlice County, Lesser Poland Voivodeship, in southern Poland. It is the seat of the gmina (administrative district) called Gmina Ropa.

The village has a population of 3,700.

References

Ropa
Kraków Voivodeship (1919–1939)